This is a list of articles describing popular music acts that incorporate the accordion. The accordion appeared in popular music from the 1900s-1960s. This half century is often called the "Golden Age of the Accordion." Three players: Pietro Frosini, and the two brothers Count Guido Deiro and Pietro Deiro were major influences at this time.

References

Accordion